A meat market is a marketplace where meat is sold.

Meat market may also refer to:
Meat Market (film), 2000 Canadian horror film directed and written by Brian Clement
 Meat Market: Female Flesh Under Capitalism, a 2011 feminist book by British writer Laurie Penny
 "Meat Market", an episode in the American TV series Cupid
 Meet market, a location or activity in which people are viewed as commodities or where people typically look for a casual sex partner
 Meat Market (EP), a 1992 release by Battery
 Meat packing industry, industry that handles the slaughtering, processing, packaging, and distribution of animals
 Mercado de las Carnes, the historic meat market in Ponce, Puerto Rico

See also
 Meet Market (disambiguation)
 Butcher (disambiguation)